Red Rocks was a Canadian National Railway station northwest of Channel-Port aux Basques. It was closed and depopulated in September 1966.

See also
List of communities in Newfoundland and Labrador

Ghost towns in Newfoundland and Labrador